The Glen Finglas Estate is a property in Glen Finglas in the Trossachs, Scotland managed by The Woodland Trust. The closest towns are Aberfoyle and Callander.

The Woodland Trust has restored ancient woodland and created the Great Trossachs Path, one of Scotland's Great Trails, across the estate.

References

External links 
http://www.glen-finglas.info/

Parks in Stirling (council area)
Nature reserves in Scotland
Woodland Trust